Miconia minutiflora is a species of tree in the family Melastomataceae. It is native to North and South America.

References

minutiflora
Trees of Brazil
Trees of Peru
Trees of Bolivia
Taxa named by Aimé Bonpland